was an officer in the Imperial Japanese Navy during World War II. He was a member of the 51st Class of the Imperial Japanese Naval Academy, ranking 185 of 255 Cadets. He took overall command of forces during the Battle of Milne Bay from Masajiro Hayashi and "was seriously wounded" during the battle.

Known Assignments 
Division Officer, Notoro - ??? - 26 May 1930
Gunnery Officer, Nenohi - 20 June 1934 - 10 November 1936
Gunnery Officer, Tatsuta - 10 November 1936 - 1 December 1937
Gunnery Officer, Tokiwa - 1 December 1937 - 1 June 1938
Gunnery Officer, Chiyoda - 1 November 1939 - 15 October 1940
Commanding Officer, 3rd Kure Naval District Special Naval Landing Force (SNLF) - 1 February 1942 - 1 November 1942
Reserve Status - 1 November 1943

Promotions 
Midshipman - 14 July 1923
Ensign - 1 December 1924
Sub-Lieutenant - 1 December 1926
Lieutenant - 30 November 1929
Lieutenant Commander - 1 December 1936
Commander - 15 October 1941

Japanese military personnel of World War II

Notes

References 
Duffy, J.P. (2016). War at the End of the World: Douglas MacArthur and the Forgotten Fight For New Guinea, 1942-1945 (pp. 164-165). New York, NY: Penguin.